Chakvrigu is a census town in Balurghat CD Block in Balurghat subdivision of Dakshin Dinajpur district in the state of West Bengal, India.

Geography

Location

Chak Bhrigu is located across the Atreyee opposite Balurghat. There is a bridge across the river.

In the map alongside, all places marked on the map are linked in the full screen version.

Demographics
As per the 2011 Census of India, Chak Bhrigu had a total population of 6,269, of which 3,201 (51%) were males and 3,068 (49%) were females. Population below 6 years was 448. The total number of literates in Chak Bhrigu was 5,253 (90.24% of the population over 6 years).

References

Cities and towns in Dakshin Dinajpur district